Tyler M. Allen (born October 12, 1998) is an American soccer player who currently plays for FC Tucson in the USL League One.

Career

Youth
Allen played with his local side Honolulu Bulls, who he helped to reach the regional's in 2016.

College & Amateur
Allen attended the University of Nevada, Las Vegas in 2016 to play college soccer. Over four seasons with the Rebels, Allen made 76 appearances, scoring 2 goals and tallying 6 assists. Allen was part of the team's WAC championship side in his freshman season.

In 2018 and 2019, Allen also played with USL League Two side FC Golden State Force.

Professional
On July 1, 2020, Allen signed with USL Championship side Reno 1868. Reno 1868 ceased operations as a club following their 2020 season.

On February 25, 2021, Allen joined USL League One side Forward Madison. He made his professional debut on May 8, 2021, starting in a 1–1 draw with FC Tucson.

Allen then signed with FC Tucson on February 2, 2022.

References

1998 births
Living people
American soccer players
Association football forwards
UNLV Rebels men's soccer players
FC Golden State Force players
Reno 1868 FC players
Forward Madison FC players
FC Tucson players
Soccer players from Honolulu
People from Honolulu
USL League One players
USL League Two players
Association football fullbacks